29th Regiment or 29th Infantry Regiment may refer to:

 29th (Punjab) Bengal Infantry
 29th Field Artillery Regiment
 29th Infantry Regiment (Greece)
 29th Infantry Regiment (United States)
 29th (Kent) Searchlight Regiment, Royal Artillery
 29th (Worcestershire) Regiment of Foot

 American Civil War regiments 
 Confederate (Southern) Army regiments
 29th Arkansas Infantry Regiment

 Union (Northern) Army regiments
 29th Illinois Volunteer Infantry Regiment
 29th Indiana Infantry Regiment
 29th Iowa Volunteer Infantry Regiment
 29th Regiment Kentucky Volunteer Infantry
 29th Maine Volunteer Infantry Regiment
 29th Regiment Massachusetts Volunteer Infantry
 29th Michigan Volunteer Infantry Regiment
 29th New York Volunteer Infantry Regiment
 29th Ohio Infantry
 29th Virginia Infantry
 29th Wisconsin Volunteer Infantry Regiment
 29th Regiment, United States Colored Infantry

See also
29th Division (disambiguation)
29th Brigade (disambiguation)
29 Squadron (disambiguation)